Distorted is a heavy metal band from Bat-Yam, Israel.

History
The band was formed in 1996 and released two demos. In 2002 they began concentrating more seriously on playing live. In 2001, the band released its first official release, a self-titled EP, which was followed by another EP which was recorded in 2003 and released in 2004 - Illusive. Following the release of those EPs, the band started performing extensively around the Tel Aviv area, supporting such international bands as Edguy, Destruction, and Megadeth, and such local bands as Betzefer, Salem, and Orphaned Land.

In 2003 and 2004 the band began to write the music for their debut album Memorial which was recorded in 2005 in Studio Underground in Sweden. The band then signed a deal with NMC Records in Israel and the French label Bad Reputation for worldwide release. The album was released on March 13, 2006, in Israel and May 2, 2006, in the rest of Europe, and the band toured in Israel and Europe in support of the album, including performing at the 2007 Metal Female Voices Fest in Belgium, and supporting Aborted on their European tour. On July 12, 2007, the band signed a worldwide distribution three-album deal with UK based label Candlelight Records.

The band parted ways with its longtime lead singer Miri Milman in late 2008 due to personal reasons and musical differences. The band then announced the new singer will be Michal Akrabi.

Michal performed with the band on some shows, including opening for Draconian on their show in Israel and the 2009 Hellelujah Metal Fest but it was announced on May 26, 2009, that Michal would leave the band as she was leaving Israel to study music in the UK. The band will continue without her as they announced they will be continue writing material for their third album, due for release in 2010 on Candlelight Records.

In March 2010, the band announced its newest lead singer - a promising young singer by the name of Dor Mazor. Dor's debut show with the band took place on June 3, 2010, at the Barby club in Tel Aviv, Israel, opening for Swallow the Sun.

Influences
The band cite their influences as Opeth, Nevermore, Dark Tranquility and The Gathering, though there is a heavy Middle-Eastern influence to their sound, similar to countrymates Orphaned Land.

Band members

Current members
Dor Mazor - lead vocals (2010–present)
Raffael Mor - guitar, harsh vocals (1996–present)
Benny Zohar - guitar (1996–present)
Guy Shalom - bass (1998–present)
Amir Segev - drums, percussion (2008–present)

Timeline

Former members
Miri Milman - lead vocals (1998–2008)
Michal Akrabi - lead vocals (2008–2009)
Ori Eshel - drums, percussion (1996–2006)
Matan Shmuely - drums, percussion (2006–2007)
Shaked Furman - drums, percussion (2007–2008)

Discography

Studio albums
(2006) Memorial
(2008) Voices from Within

Singles and EPs
(2001) Distorted
(2004) Illusive

Demos
Distorted (1998, three tracks)
Demo (2000, two tracks)

References

External links
Distorted official site
Distorted MySpace page
Distorted at Candlelight Records

Oriental metal musical groups
Israeli progressive metal musical groups
Musical groups established in 1996
Musical quintets